This is a list of films which have placed number one at the weekend box office in the United States during 1981.

Number-one films

Highest-grossing films
The top ten films released in 1981 by box office gross in the United States and Canada are as follows:

See also
 List of American films — American films by year
 Lists of box office number-one films

Notes

References

External links
 Domestic Box Office Weekends For 1981 (Box Office Mojo)
 Theatrical Weekly Box Office Chart Calendar for 1981 (The Numbers)

Chronology

1981
1981 in American cinema
1981-related lists